The 1985 Wichita State Shockers football team represented Wichita State University in the 1985 NCAA Division I-A football season. The Shockers competed in their 89th season overall and 42nd in the Missouri Valley Conference, playing their home games at Cessna Stadium. The team, led by second-year head coach Ron Chismar, improved on their 2–9 output from the previous season, going 3–8.

This was the final season of football for the Missouri Valley Conference, as the league, which by this point was a mixture of NCAA Division I-A (Tulsa and Wichita State) and NCAA Division I-AA programs (Drake, Illinois State, Indiana State, Southern Illinois, and West Texas State), voted on April 30, 1985 to drop football at the end of the 1985 season.

Schedule

References

External Links
Wichita State - Kansas State Football Game

Wichita State
Wichita State Shockers football seasons
Wichita State Shockers football